Welcome to Myrtle Manor, also known as Trailer Park: Welcome To Myrtle Manor, is an American reality television series on TLC that premiered on March 3, 2013, with filming of the first season taking place from August to November 2012. TLC ordered a second season in May 2013 that consists of ten episodes and debuted on January 16, 2014. Filming for the second season began the last week of June 2013 and completed in October 2013. The series' production company, The Weinstein Company, announced that the series would be renamed Trailer Park: Welcome To Myrtle Manor beginning with the second season in order to leave the option open for spin-off series set in other trailer parks across the United States.

It was announced on July 10, 2014, that Welcome to Myrtle Manor had been renewed for a third season that consists of 10 episodes. Filming began on August 11, 2014, and continued through January 2015.

On June 4, 2015, the cast announced that TLC would not be going forward with a fourth season. The cast asked for fans of the show to let TLC know that they wanted a fourth season. As of 2016, TLC had "no plans" for another season. Cecil Patrick, owner of the mobile home park, said it was still a tourist attraction, especially among those whose lives were similar to the park's residents.

Premise
Welcome to Myrtle Manor documents the lives and problems of the residents at Myrtle Manor — also named Patrick's Mobile Home Park — a trailer park community located in Myrtle Beach, South Carolina. The series includes drinking, relationship drama and the struggle as Cecil hands over the park to his youngest daughter, Becky. Some of the cast members have lived in the park for years, others had just arrived.

Cast
 Cecil Patrick—Cecil is Becky's father and the owner of the trailer park. His father built Myrtle Manor.
 Becky Robertson—Becky is manager of Myrtle Manor Mobile Home Park and the daughter of Cecil. The trailer park has been within Becky's family for years, and now her father has passed management of it onto her.
 Jeana Futrell—"Miss Jeana" is Becky's aunt and Cecil's sister. After a 20-year marriage, she moved to the park once her divorce was settled.
 Chelsey Keller— Chelsey and Lindsay are shown running a start-up hot-dog business named Darlin' Dog in the first season. In the second season, the hot-dog business is no more and Chelsey now works at Ripley's Aquarium as a mermaid. In the episode Bogged Down in Love, Chelsey begins to date Jared and the two get married in the season one finale.
 Amanda Lee Adams—Amanda was a part of the Darlin' Dog hot-dog business in the first season, but is now a cocktail waitress at The Bowery Bar. Adams was arrested on April 26, 2013 and charged with DUI. Police discovered Adams and her black Jeep Wrangler smashed head-on into an electric pole. She admitted to "consuming three beers and four shots", then took a breathalyzer test and blew a .20, which is more than twice the legal limit in South Carolina.
 Kevin Horseman – Kevin joined the series in the 3rd season, and is Amanda's boyfriend. "Calvin" is his nickname from Marvin. 
 Gina Shelley—Gina is a co-owner of the park's hair salon, Tangulls.
 Roy Bullard—Roy is a former drag queen and also a co-owner of Tangulls. He is also a pageant coach and judge.
 Anne Johnson—Anne is a former teacher. She has two sons.
 Taylor J. Burt-Taylor is Anne's entrepreneur son. He has an on and off relationship with Jessica Burke. Taylor left the series after season 1.
 Jessica Burke-Taylor's on and off again girlfriend. Jessica leaves the series after season 1 but returns in season 3.
 Jared Stetson— Jared develops a relationship with Chelsey over the course of the first season and the couple gets married in the season-one finale.
 Lindsay Colbert -Chelsea's first roommate and partner of Darlin’ Dog, was evicted from the park after starting a fight with Amanda in season 1. 
 Marvin Gerald—Marvin is the head of security at the park.
 Roger "Bandit" Kelly—Bandit writes show tunes. He was evicted in the first season, but has since moved back in.
 Miss Peggy Beaulieu—Miss Peggy is Myrtle Manor's oldest resident; she's lived there for over 30 years.
 Brittney Austin -Brittney joined the series in the second season, and is a new resident of Myrtle Manor. She works at a fragrance kiosk.
 Brock Reiman-Brock joined the series in the second season, and is the handyman at Myrtle Manor.
 Kimberly Evans-Kimberly is the third new cast member Welcome to Myrtle Manor. She's a four-year resident of Myrtle Manor, and is the housekeeping supervisor at Ocean Park Resort.
 Stephania Schmidt-Stephania is another new resident of Myrtle Manor, and is the fourth new addition to the cast. She is of Spanish and German descent.

Episodes

Series overview

Season 1 (2013)

Season 2 (2014)

Season 3 (2015)

Economic impact
A Coastal Carolina University study determined the show's annual economic contribution to the Myrtle Beach area to be $101 million. Over $2 million of that was direct spending by those producing the show. Sales of show-related products totalled $800,000. If an episode was assumed to be equal in promotion value to a 30-second ad, the value was $3.3 million. The remainder assumed that 1 percent of visitors considered the show to have influenced their decision to come to Myrtle Beach.

References

2010s American reality television series
2013 American television series debuts
2015 American television series endings
English-language television shows
Television shows set in South Carolina
TLC (TV network) original programming